Brian Schumacher (born 14 May 1960) is a British boxer. He competed in the men's middleweight event at the 1984 Summer Olympics.

Schumacher won the 1981 and 1984 Amateur Boxing Association British middleweight title, when boxing for the Royal Navy.

References

External links
 

1960 births
Living people
British male boxers
Olympic boxers of Great Britain
Boxers at the 1984 Summer Olympics
Boxers from Liverpool
Middleweight boxers